Conrad Pla (born October 24, 1966) is a Canadian actor and former professional kickboxer. He is best known for founding Tristar Gym and starring in the Canadian television series ReGenesis.

Early life
Pla was born in Madrid and moved to Canada with his parents at the age of three.

Career 
Pla was a professional kickboxer between the ages of 18 and 32. He competed in the light heavyweight and super middleweight division. With 26 pro fights, he was ranked 3rd in the world, was the ISKA North American Champion as well as the WKA Intercontinental Champion. He fought Javier Mendez for the ISKA World title in Santa Cruz, California, in 1995 but lost a close split decision. An injury forced him to retire from the sport.

He started the Tristar Gym in 1991 together with Michel Lavallée and Ron Di Cecco. In 2001, the gym was sold to Alexandre Choko. He teaches kickboxing and Muay Thai in Montreal.

After his injury he turned to acting. He has studied with Danielle Schneider and Ivana Chubbuck. He had supporting roles in films such as 16 Blocks, The Terminal, Confessions of a Dangerous Mind, The Sum of All Fears, Jericho Mansions, Max Payne and Pawn Sacrifice. He was the male lead in the 2004 horror film Eternal. In 2009, Pla was the writer and director for Burning Mussolini, in which he also acted opposite his friend and ReGenesis co-star Peter Outerbridge. In 2013, he had a supporting role in the film Riddick as Vargas. He also played the main antagonist of Assassin's Creed IV: Black Flag, Governor Laureano de Torres y Ayala. He also played the voicing of Jackal in Rainbow Six Siege. In 2017, Pla portrayed the science officer Colonel Janus over the course of five episodes of the space opera TV series, The Expanse. In 2021, Pla appeared in Ubisoft's Far Cry 6 as guerilla fighter Carlos Montero.

Filmography

Film

Television

Video games

References

External links
 
 

1966 births
Canadian male film actors
Canadian male kickboxers
Canadian Muay Thai practitioners
Canadian male television actors
Canadian male voice actors
Living people
Male actors from Madrid
Male actors from Montreal
Spanish emigrants to Canada
Sportspeople from Madrid
Sportspeople from Montreal